Mohd Azinee Bin Taib (born 18 July 1990 in Johor Bahru, Johor) is a Malaysian footballer who is currently playing as an attacking midfielder for Perak FC. He is well known for his speed and technical ability, as well as the powerful shot from distance.

Club career

Johor FA (2012)
A product of the Johor State Football Association, Taib signed a professional contract with Malaysian Premier League (MPL) outfit Johor FA to serve as their forward, attacking midfielder.

Johor Darul Takzim (2013)
Taib was promoted to Malaysian Super League side Johor Darul Takzim in 2013.

Johor Darul Takzim II (2014)
After not being selected for Johor Darul Takzim 2014 Squad, Taib was called up to help youngsters in Johor Darul Takzim II. He made 27 appearances and scored 8 goals.

Penang FA (2015)
Taib, once again not selected, made his way through to Johor Darul Takzim under Bojan Hodak. Later he signed a one-year deal to Penang FA. He made 16 appearances and scored 8 goals, helping Penang FA secure promotion to Malaysian Super League for 2016.

Johor Darul Takzim (2016) 
Taib joined Johor Darul Takzim after his contract with Penang FA ended.

Johor Darul Ta'zim II (2017) 
After not being selected for Johor Darul Ta'zim 2017 squad, Taib rejoined Johor Darul Ta'zim II for 2017 season.

Melaka United (2017) 
In June 2017, Melaka United announced that they had agreed a deal with Johor Darul Ta'zim to sign Taib on loan deal.

Career statistics

Club

Honors

Club
Johor Darul Ta'zim
 Malaysia Super League: 2016
 Malaysia FA Cup: 2016
 Malaysia Charity Shield: 2016

References

External links
 Profile at ifball.com
 http://www.eurosport.com/football/mohd-azniee-taib_prs342843/person.shtml

1990 births
Malaysian footballers
Living people
People from Johor
Melaka United F.C. players
Johor Darul Ta'zim F.C. players
Penang F.C. players
Malaysia Super League players
Association football forwards
Association football midfielders
Malaysian people of Malay descent